Jinggang Shan (999) is a ship of China's Type 071 amphibious transport dock Yuzhao class. The ship was launched on 16 November 2010. After finishing trials the ship was commissioned to the South Sea Fleet. Its estimated production cost is USD 300 million.

Use
On 9 March 2014, the ship was deployed in the search for the missing Malaysia Airlines Flight 370.

References 

Google Maps: https://goo.gl/maps/zs9Sa4DUJVT2 (Here you can watch Jinggang Shan (999) next to Mischief Reef).

Type 071 amphibious transport docks
2010 ships
Vessels involved in the search for Malaysia Airlines Flight 370